Neal Gordon Musser (born August 25, 1980) is a former American Major League Baseball pitcher.

Musser was draft June 2, 1999 by the New York Mets in the 2nd round of the 1999 amateur draft. He was signed June 23, 1999. On October 15, 2005 he was granted Free Agency. On January 30, 2006, he signed as a Free Agent with the Arizona Diamondbacks. On May 23, 2006 he was released by the Arizona Diamondbacks. On May 24, 2006 he signed as a Free Agent with the Kansas City Royals. On October 15, 2006 he was granted Free Agency. On November 20, 2006 he resigned as a Free Agent with the Kansas City Royals. 
On February 19, Musser was designated for assignment to make way for the newly claimed Tug Hulett from the Seattle Mariners, and he was subsequently released eight days later. In March 2009 Musser signed a minor league deal with the Houston Astros. On May 4, 2009 he was released. On February 2, 2010 Musser signed as a Free Agent with the New York Mets. He is now retired and moved back to his hometown of Otterbein, Indiana.

External links
, or Retrosheet, or Baseball Reference (Minor, Fall, Independent and Winter Leagues), or Pelota Binaria (Venezuelan League)

1980 births
Living people
Arizona League Royals players
Baseball players from Indiana
Binghamton Mets players
Brooklyn Cyclones players
Capital City Bombers players
Grand Canyon Rafters players
Gulf Coast Mets players
Kansas City Royals players
Kingsport Mets players
Lancaster Barnstormers players
Leones del Escogido players
American expatriate baseball players in the Dominican Republic
Major League Baseball pitchers
Navegantes del Magallanes players
American expatriate baseball players in Venezuela
Norfolk Tides players
Omaha Royals players
People from Lafayette, Indiana
Round Rock Express players
St. Lucie Mets players
Team USA players
Tucson Sidewinders players
Wichita Wranglers players